The Learjet 23 (originally Lear Jet 23) is an American six-to-eight-seat (two crew and four to six passengers) twinjet, high-speed business jet manufactured by Learjet. Introduced in 1964, it was Learjet's first model and created a new market for fast and efficient small business aircraft. Production ended in 1966 after 101 aircraft had been delivered.

Development
Recognizing the potential of the Swiss-designed single-engine ground-attack FFA P-16 fighter jet, William (Bill) Powell Lear, Sr. established Swiss American Aviation Corporation (SAAC) to produce a two-engined passenger version: the SAAC-23 Execujet. The company moved to Wichita, Kansas and was renamed Lear Jet Corporation. Production began on the first Model 23 Lear Jet on February 7, 1962. The first flight took place on 7 October 1963 with test pilots Hank Beaird and Bob Hagen. On 4 June 1964, the prototype crashed soon after takeoff, when the pilot inadvertently deployed the wing spoilers while demonstrating an engine failure on takeoff. Eventually determined to be pilot error, this mishap did not deter the Federal Aviation Agency (later the Federal Aviation Administration) from awarding the Lear Jet 23 its type certificate on 31 July 1964. On October 13, 1964, the first production aircraft was delivered.

Production ended in 1966 after one hundred and one aircraft had been delivered. In 1998, thirty nine Model 23s were estimated to remain in use. Twenty seven are known to have been lost or damaged beyond repair through accidents, the most recent being in 2008.

Noise compliance
In 2013, the FAA modified 14 CFR part 91 rules to prohibit the operation of jets weighing 75,000 pounds or less that are not stage 3 noise compliant after December 31, 2015.  The Learjet 23 is listed explicitly in Federal Register 78 FR 39576.  Any Learjet 23s that have not been modified by installing Stage 3 noise compliant engines or have not had "hushkits" installed for non-compliant engines will not be permitted to fly in the contiguous 48 states after December 31, 2015.  14 CFR §91.883 Special flight authorizations for jet airplanes weighing 75,000 pounds or less – lists special flight authorizations that may be granted for operation after December 31, 2015.

Aircraft on display

 N802L – Model 23 on static display at the Udvar-Hazy Center of the National Air and Space Museum in Chantilly, Virginia.
 N505PF – Model 23 on static display at the Kansas Aviation Museum in Wichita, Kansas.
 N20EP – on display outside White Industries, Bates City, Missouri.
 N23BY – Model 23 on display at the Arkansas Air & Military Museum in Fayetteville, Arkansas. This airframe was flown by Bobby Younkin in air shows.
 N154AG – Model 23 on static display at the Museum of Flight in Seattle, Washington.
 N73CE – Model 23 on display at the Yanks Air Museum in Chino, California.
 N824LJ – Model 23 on static display at the Air Zoo in Portage, Michigan.
 N88B – Model 23 on static display at the Pima Air and Space Museum in Tucson, Arizona.

Operators

 NASA
 Executive Jet Aviation

Specifications

See also

References

External links

 A history of the Learjet 23-29 series on Airliners.net
 Lear Jet Prototype Nears October Flight Date – Aviation Week & Space Technology
 The William P. and Moya Olsen Lear Papers at The Museum of Flight (Seattle, Wash.)

23
1960s United States business aircraft
Twinjets
Aircraft first flown in 1963
Low-wing aircraft
T-tail aircraft